Ánimas Trujano may refer to:

 Ánimas Trujano (film), a 1962 Mexican film directed by Ismael Rodríguez
 Ánimas Trujano, Oaxaca, a town and municipality in Oaxaca in south-western Mexico